Pravia is one of fifteen parishes (administrative divisions) in Pravia, a municipality within the province and autonomous community of Asturias, in northern Spain.

The population is 6,660 (INE 2011).

Villages and hamlets
 Agones
 Cañedo (Cañéu)
 Cadarienzo
 Campasola 
 Corralinos
 El Cabrón 
 Forcinas
 Peñaullán (Pinullán) 
 Prahúa
 Pravia

References

Parishes in Pravia